The episodes of the Japanese anime series Monochrome Factor are directed by Yuu Kou, produced by Genco, and animated by A.C.G.T. The anime is an adaptation of Kaili Sorano's manga of the same name, which is currently serialized in the manga magazine, Comic Blade Avarus. The story revolves around high school student Akira Nikaido, who, upon meeting a mysterious man named Shirogane, must become a "shin", or creature of the shadow world, in order to restore balance between the human and shadow worlds.

The anime premiered on the Japanese television network TV Tokyo on April 7, 2008. It broadcast a total of twenty-four episodes, with the last of which airing on September 29, 2008. Though the episodes aired on TV Tokyo first, the series also aired on other networks such as AT-X and TV Osaka within days of the original broadcast. Shochiku distributed the episodes over a span of eight DVD volumes, with each compilation containing three episodes. The first volume was released on August 8, 2008, and the eighth was released on March 13, 2009.

Three pieces of theme music are used for the episodes: one opening theme and two ending themes. The opening theme is "Metamorphose" which is performed by Asriel and written by Kokomi. Both ending themes are written by Yumi Matsuzawa, and the four performing artists are also voice actors for the series. Asriel released a single for "Metamorphose" on April 23, 2008. The singles for "Awake ~my everything~" and "Kakuse ~Dark and Light~" were released on May 28 and August 27 of 2008, respectively.


Episode list

References

Monochrome Factor